Serena Williams's 2003 tennis season ended abruptly after Wimbledon, as Williams underwent surgery on the quadriceps tendon in her knee at the start of August. Initially she was expected to be out for six to eight weeks.

Year in detail

Australian Open and early hard court season

Hopman Cup
Williams began her season at the Hopman Cup as a preparation for the Australian Open teaming up with James Blake. They played their first tie against Uzbekistan represented by Iroda Tulyaganova and Oleg Ogorodov, Williams won her singles and mixed doubles match both in straight sets. In the second tie, they took on the Spanish pairing of Virginia Ruano Pascual and Tommy Robredo and won all their matches in straight sets. In the final tie, they took on Kim Clijsters and Xavier Malisse for a spot in the final, Williams defeated Clijsters in straight sets, but Malisse defeated Blake to push it to a decisive Mixed Doubles match, which Williams and Blake won in a match tie-break. In the final they took on Australia's Alicia Molik and Lleyton Hewitt and won all three matches to take the Hopman Cup.

Australian Open
 Williams came into the Australian Open trying to win her fourth consecutive slam after winning the 2002 editions of French Open, Wimbledon, and US Open. Williams opened her campaign against Frenchwoman Émilie Loit. Williams fell to a slow start as Loit took advantage and claimed the first set. The second set was close, as Williams was pushed to a tie-break, where Loit was 3 points away from the upset, however Williams took the tie-break by seven points to five. In the deciding set, Williams had two match points at the tenth game, however Loit saved them to take the game. Williams eventually took the match in the twelfth game in her third match point, overcoming 55 unforced errors she hit in the match. In her next match, she took on Els Callens, the match went on plan for Williams, as she only dropped four games, including a bagel in the second set. Williams also produced 21 winners and 13 unforced errors. In the round of 32, Williams faced Thai Tamarine Tanasugarn, and made quick work delivering a double breadstick domination. In the fourth round, Williams made a slow start but eventually defeated Eleni Daniilidou in straight sets to advance. In the last 8, Williams took on compatriot Meghann Shaughnessy, assuring an American semifinalist, however Williams didn't give Shaughnessy a look only dropping two games each set, and was helped by 8 aces she fired down in the match. In the final four, Williams took on Belgian Kim Clijsters. The first set saw Williams struggled, including making two consecutive double faults to give away the set in the tenth game. The second set saw a comeback from the younger Williams as she broke Clijsters in the fifth and ninth game to push it to a decider. In the final set, Clijsters took a commanding lead taking five of the first six games. However Williams made a comeback and won the last six games, including saving two match points in the eight game on the Clijsters serve to advance to the final. In the final, Serena Williams faced older sister Venus, in the siblings fourth consecutive slam final, being the first pair in women's tennis to compete in four consecutive slam finals, the sisters were also squared at four wins a piece in their previous meetings. The first set saw Venus served for the set, but failed to do so, as Serena pushed it to a tie-break and win seven games to four. However the older Williams came back and took the second set. In the final set Venus saved breakpoints in the eight game, but eventually got broken in the tenth game to hand her sister the victory. Serena had 54 errors to Venus' 51, but beat her 37–28 on winners. This win marks Serena holding the four slams, first since Steffi Graf in 1994, this achievement by Serena was dubbed as the "Serena Slam", as it could not be called a Grand Slam as it did not happen in the same calendar year.

Williams played with sister Venus Williams in the doubles tournament. They breezed through the final without dropping a set defeating the teams Rita Grande and Patty Schnyder, Casey Dellacqua and Nicole Sewell, Svetlana Kuznetsova and Martina Navratilova, Kim Clijsters and Ai Sugiyama, and Lindsay Davenport and Lisa Raymond. In the final, they were pushed by Virginia Ruano Pascual and Paolo Suárez, dropping their first set of the tournament, before coming back to take the final two sets. This is the sisters sixth slam title as a team and second Australian Open title.

Open Gaz de France
Williams' next tournament after her achieving the 'Serena Slam' was at the Open Gaz de France. As the top seed, Williams received a bye in the first round. Her first opponent was Swiss Myriam Casanova, the American dominated the first set with a bagel and the took a tight second set in the tenth game. She then followed it up with a win against Slovakian Janette Husárová, winning each set with a drop of only three games. In the final four, Williams took on Eleni Daniilidou and dominated the match dropping only two games both in the first set. She only drop six points on serve in the entire match. In the final, It was against Amélie Mauresmo and dominated the Frenchwoman, the first six games went on serve, before Williams took 9 of the last 11 games to take the title and remain unbeaten in 2013.

NASDAQ-100 Open
After continuing her boycott of the Pacific Life Open, Williams played at the NASDAQ-100 Open and was the defending champion. After receiving a bye in the first round, she took on Italian Francesca Schiavone, after a tight first set, which Williams took on the twelfth game, she cruised through the second dropping only a game to advance. She then cruised pass Tatiana Panova in straight sets, dropping only three games. In the fourth round, she faced Iroda Tulyaganova, where she took the first set with ease, winning it with a bagel. In the second set, Williams won the set by a break lead, closing it out in the tenth game. In the last 8, Williams faced Frenchwoman Marion Bartoli, Bartoli failed to hold serve in the match getting broken all eight of her service games, while breaking Williams three times. Williams hit 31 winners to aid her in her win. In the semifinals, Williams push pass with a comfortable win, in a rematch of the epic Australian Open semifinal against Kim Clijsters. Williams won in straight sets despite making 37 unforced errors. In the final, Williams took on compatriot and rival Jennifer Capriati, who was celebrating her birthday. Williams broke Capriati in the second game, but Capriati took six of the next eight games to hand Williams her first set drop in the event and first since the Australian Open final. Williams took the first four games of the second set, just to see Capriati reel in four of the next five games to bring it back on serve, however Williams broke her compatriot in the tenth game to push it to a decider. In the final set, Williams dominated allowing only Capriati a game to take her third title of the season and remain unbeaten in the year with 17–0 record.

Clay court season and French Open

Family Circle Cup
Williams played her first clay court event of the season at the green clay of Family Circle Cup. As the top seed, she received a bye in the first round, then defeated Dally Randriantefy of Madagascar, dropping only three games, including a bagel in the second. In the following match, She made quick work of Conchita Martínez in 61 minutes, winning both sets at two. She also made quick work of Australian Jelena Dokić, also dropping only two games in each set, despite getting broken once. In the semifinals, Williams faced compatriot Lindsay Davenport. Williams made quick work of the first set, dropping only one game. In the second set, Williams took an early break lead; however Davenport broke back in the eight game. Williams then broke again in the 11th game to serve it out. Williams saved two break points with two aces and eventually closed it out to advance. In the final, Williams took on Belgian Justine Henin-Hardenne. Williams took the first three games to start the match, but Henin-Hardenne took the next six games, allowing Williams to only win 3 of the last 26 points in the set. Williams once again led by a break in the second set, but Henin-Hardenne took six of the last eight games to win the match. This loss marked an end to Williams's undefeated streak in 2003 at 21 wins.

Telecom Italia Masters
Williams final French Open preparation was at the Telecom Italia Masters. After a bye in the first round, Williams went against Klára Zakopalová and defeated the Czech with a break lead in each set. Williams then dominated Nathalie Dechy, winning the first set at three and scoring a bagel against the Frenchwoman in the second set. Facing Conchita Martínez in the  last eight, Williams scraped through a tight first set winning it in the twelfth game, but made easy work in the second set, dropping only 2 games. In the semifinals, Williams took on Frenchwoman Amélie Mauresmo, Williams dominated the first set, dropping only a game. Williams then served for the match in tenth game of the second and was two points away from the match, but Mauresmo broke Williams and then broke her again in the twelfth game to take the set. In the final set, Mauresmo broke Williams in the eight game and then served it out take eliminate Williams.

French Open
Williams came into the French Open as the top seed and defending champion, and coming in with a 28-match winning streak in slams. Williams started her campaign for a fifth consecutive slam against Barbara Rittner, Williams broke early but Rittner broke back in the fourth game. However, the break seemed to fire up Williams, as Williams won ten of the next eleven games to advance in 52 minutes. She then followed it up with a straight set win against Swiss Marie-Gayanay Mikaelian, dropping just five games. In the third round, Williams delivered a double bagel beatdown against former world no. 7 Barbara Schett in just 40 minutes. Schett won just 20 points, 16 of which came from Williams' unforced errors. In the round of 16, Williams faced Japan's Ai Sugiyama, Sugiyama took an early break lead but Williams came back and won five of next six games, closing it out in the twelfth game. Williams then took control of the second set with a break lead. In the final 8, It was a rematch of the Rome semifinals, when Williams took on Amélie Mauresmo, where Williams took control of the whole match. Williams took the first four games before Mauresmo could take a game, Williams then rallied to take the next six games, along the way taking the first set. I remained on serve as Williams closed it out. Williams made 24 winners to Mauresmo's 5, Mauresmo also hit 35 unforced errors. In the semifinals, Williams took on Justine Henin-Hardenne in rematch of the Charleston final, The pair traded the first two sets, Henin-Hardenne taking the first at two and Williams taking the second at four. In the final set Williams broke in the fourth game to take a break lead and then held serve. However, Henin-Hardenne took six of the last seven games to end Williams 33 match winning streak in Slams. The match didn't go without controversy as Henin-Hardenne was accused of unsportsmanlike conduct when she denied having raised her hand up when Williams hit a first serve in the seventh game and denied such happened.

Wimbledon
Williams was the world no. 1 and defending coming into the Wimbledon Championships. Williams began her title defense 24-hours after the upset of no. 1 and defending men's champion Lleyton Hewitt, However, Williams did not want to be part of history to have 2 world no. 1 and defending champions bow out in the very first round as she routed compatriot Jill Craybas dropping three games in each set. In the following round, Williams faced Els Callens. Williams broke in the fifth game and that was enough to take the first set. In the second set, Williams took the first four games, however Callens came back and won the next four. But Williams broke once again in the ninth game and then served it out. In the next match, Williams defeated compatriot Laura Granville, breaking Granville once and in the first, which was proven enough to take the set. In the next set, Williams only dropped a game to continue her title defense. In the round of 16, Williams made quick work of Russian Elena Dementieva winning each set at two. In the quarterfinals, Williams had a tough match against another American Jennifer Capriati. Williams started slow, which allowed Capriati to take control of the first set and win it dropping only two games. However, Williams fought back winning the second set dropping only two games as well. In the ninth game of the deciding set, Williams was serving for the match and saved two break points, and eventually closed it out to advance. In the match for a spot in the final, Williams had the tough task as she faces Justine Henin-Hardenne, one of two players who has beaten her in 2003 and the only player she hasn't beaten in 2003. Despite, the anticipation of the match, Williams was proven too much for her Belgian opponent. Williams raced through the first four games, but Henin-Hardenne came back on serve taking the next three games. Williams then broke and served it out to take the first set. In the second set, Williams raced pass it, dropping only two games. The final saw a rematch of last year's final. As it was a sister affair, with Serena taking on sister Venus Williams. Venus took initiative breaking in the second game, and squandered four break points in the fourth game. Serena eventually broke back, but lost her serve while serving to stay in it in the tenth game to hand Venus the first set. Serena finished with 30 unforced errors to Venus' 25. The second set saw the first three games leading to breaks. In the second set, Serena took four of the first five games, Venus got back one of the breaks, but Serena was able to close it out in the tenth game to push it to a final set. As Venus' abdominal strain showed its effects more, with serves around 85 mph and many errors, Serena took initiative and closed out the match in the eight game. This was Serena's 5th slam of the last six and her 6th overall.

She and Venus competed in the doubles as the defending champions, in the first round they took on Corina Morariu and Rennae Stubbs, where they dropped the first set in a tie-break, but cruise pass the next two sets dropping only five games. They then made quick work of Australians Alicia Molik and Samantha Stosur, winning with a double breadstick scoreline. However, they fell to the Russian team of Elena Dementieva and Lina Krasnoroutskaya, losing in the third set 7–5.

US Open, Year-End Championships and hard court season
Williams had a surgery to repair a partial tear in the middle portion of the quadriceps tendon of her left knee in August, which forced her to withdraw from events following Wimbledon, including the US Open and the Year-End Championships, which in turn also dropped her world no. 1 ranking to Kim Clijsters.

Fed Cup
Williams represented the United States Fed Cup team against Czech Republic and won all her matches. She defeated Iveta Benešová and Klára Zakopalová in straight sets. She toughed out the first set against Benešová and cruised pass the second set, while against Zakopalová it was all cruise control for the American. She also teamed up with sister Venus Williams to defeat Dája Bedáňová and Eva Birnerová dropping just a game. The Williams sisters made a 5–0 sweep for United States.

All matches

Singles matches

Doubles matches

Hopman Cup Matches

Tournament schedule

Singles schedule
Williams' 2003 singles tournament schedule is as follows:

Doubles schedule
Williams' 2003 doubles tournament schedule is as follows:

Yearly records

Head–to–head matchups
Ordered by percentage of wins

 Els Callens 2–0
 Klára Zakopalová 2–0
 Eleni Daniilidou 2–0
 Kim Clijsters 2–0
 Venus Williams 2–0
 Conchita Martínez 2–0
 Jennifer Capriati 2–0
 Myriam Casanova 1–0
 Tamarine Tanasugarn 1–0
 Meghann Shaughnessy 1–0
 Janette Husárová 1–0
 Émilie Loit 1–0
 Francesca Schiavone 1–0
 Tatiana Panova 1–0
 Iroda Tulyaganova 1–0
 Marion Bartoli 1–0
 Dally Randriantefy 1–0
 Jelena Dokić 1–0
 Karolina Šprem 1–0
 Lindsay Davenport 1–0
 Iveta Benešová 1–0
 Nathalie Dechy 1–0
 Barbara Rittner 1–0
 Marie-Gayanay Mikaelian 1–0
 Barbara Schett 1–0
 Ai Sugiyama 1–0
 Jill Craybas 1–0
 Laura Granville 1–0
 Elena Dementieva 1–0
 Amélie Mauresmo 2–1
 Justine Henin-Hardenne 1–2

Finals

Singles: 5 (4–1)

Doubles: 1 (1–0)

Earnings

 Figures in United States dollars (USD) unless noted.

See also
2003 WTA Tour

References

External links

Serena Williams tennis seasons
Williams, Serena
2003 in American tennis